FC Dnyapro Mogilev was a Belarusian football club from Mogilev. Their home stadium is Spartak Stadium.

History 
Dnyapro Mogilev was founded in early 2019 as a result of merger between Dnepr Mogilev and Luch Minsk. The united club inherited Luch's Premier League spot and licence, their sponsorships and most of the squad, while keeping only a few of Dnepr players and relocating to Mogilev. Dnepr and Luch continued its participation in youth tournaments independently from each other.

Following the relegation from Premier League Dnyapro Mogilev disbanded and Dnepr Mogilev was re-established in the Second League.

References

External links 
Official website

Defunct football clubs in Belarus
Sport in Mogilev
2019 establishments in Belarus
Association football clubs established in 2019
2019 disestablishments in Belarus
Association football clubs disestablished in 2019